Yan Meiling (born 14 January 1997) is a Chinese rugby sevens player. She competed in the women's tournament at the 2020 Summer Olympics. She represented China at the 2022 Rugby World Cup Sevens in Cape Town.

References

External links
 

1997 births
Living people
Female rugby sevens players
Olympic rugby sevens players of China
Rugby sevens players at the 2020 Summer Olympics
Place of birth missing (living people)
Rugby sevens players at the 2014 Summer Youth Olympics
Asian Games medalists in rugby union
Asian Games silver medalists for China
Medalists at the 2018 Asian Games
Rugby union players at the 2018 Asian Games
China international women's rugby sevens players